Nadia Davy (born 24 December 1980) is a Jamaican American track and field athlete, competing internationally for Jamaica. She was a bronze medalist in the 4 x 400 meter relay at the 2004 Olympic Games in Athens, Greece.

Early life
Davy was born in Jamaica but grew up in Bridgeton, New Jersey. She graduated from Bridgeton High School, where she ran track, in 1999. She set a Bridgeton High School record in the 400 meter dash with a time of 54.04 seconds. She earned six state titles in high school, including ones in the 1999 indoor and outdoor 400 meter championships.

College
Davy went to Louisiana State University to run track after high school. She was a seven-time All American at LSU and currently holds the school record in the Women's 400 meters with a time of 50.66 seconds, which she set in 2003 in her junior year.

Davy qualified for the 2004 Jamaican Olympic team after a first-place finish in the 400 meter (50.76 seconds) at the JAAA/Supreme Ventures National Senior Championships in Kingston, Jamaica.

Olympics
Davy ran two events in Athens, the 400 meter individual and the 4x400 meter relay. In the 400 meter, she ran a time of 52.04 seconds and did not place.

She won a bronze medal for the 4 x 400 meter relay (3:22:00). Davy contributed a time of 50.24 seconds during the third leg.

Today

Davy no longer lives in Bridgeton, New Jersey where she worked at her high school as an instructional aide and assistant track coach. She has a son and a daughter. She also has her master's degree in counseling from Wilmington University in Delaware.

References

1980 births
Living people
Jamaican female sprinters
Athletes (track and field) at the 2004 Summer Olympics
Bridgeton High School alumni
LSU Lady Tigers track and field athletes
Olympic athletes of Jamaica
Olympic bronze medalists for Jamaica
People from Bridgeton, New Jersey 
Place of birth missing (living people)
Medalists at the 2004 Summer Olympics
Olympic bronze medalists in athletics (track and field)
Sportspeople from Cumberland County, New Jersey
Track and field athletes from New Jersey
Olympic female sprinters